Santa María del Oro is a town and municipality, in Jalisco in central-western Mexico. The municipality covers an area of 403.88 km².

As of 2020, the municipality had a total population of 1,815.

Government

Municipal presidents

References

Municipalities of Jalisco

es:Santa María del Oro